Maeve Ingoldsby (1947 - 2021) was a former writer of the Raidió Teilifís Éireann radio show Only Slaggin' and former writer on RTÉ soap operas Glenroe and Fair City. She is a well-known playwright and satirist. She has also written numerous children's plays including Earwigs, which was awarded "Best Young Peoples' Production" at the Dublin Theatre Festival in 1995. Two of her plays were the base for children's operas of Colin Mawby, commissioned and first performed by the National Chamber Choir of Ireland.

External links
 Maeve Ingoldsby at the Doollee Playwright's Database.

References

1947 births
Irish writers
Living people